This article lists feature-length Hong Kong films released in 2021.

See also
 2021 in Hong Kong
 List of 2021 box office number-one films in Hong Kong
 List of Hong Kong films of 2022

References

External links
 IMDB list of Hong Kong films  

2021
Films
Hong Kong
Hong Kong